The Seven Spiritual Laws of Superheroes: Harnessing Our Power to Change the World is a 2011 book written by Deepak Chopra and his son Gotham Chopra.

Summary 

The book relates modern-day superheroes to spirituality. Superheroes like Superman and Batman are described to be metaphors that we can learn from to assist in real-life challenges. Throughout the book, seven laws are explained. These laws aim to help increase happiness, achieve balance, and find purpose in our lives.

Media appearances 

Deepak Chopra discussed this book at the 2006 San Diego Comic-Con. He explained how superheroes are modern mythology and their powers and abilities express our subconscious. Deepak and Gotham Chopra both discussed the book at the 2011 San Diego Comic-Con.

References

External links 
 

2011 books
Books about spirituality
HarperCollins books